The Beginner's Guide is an interactive storytelling video game created by Davey Wreden under the studio name Everything Unlimited Ltd. The game was released for Linux, OS X, and Windows on October 1, 2015. The game is Wreden's follow-up to the critically praised The Stanley Parable, his previous interactive storytelling title that was initially released in 2013.

The game is narrated by Wreden and takes the user through a number of incomplete and abstract game creations made by a developer named Coda. Wreden challenges the player to try to come to understand the type of person Coda is from exploring these spaces in a first-person perspective. Wreden has stated the game is open to interpretation: some have seen the game as general commentary on the nature of the relationship between game developers and players, while others have taken it as an allegory to Wreden's own personal struggles with success resulting from The Stanley Parable.

The game received polarized reviews. Many reviewers readily took to the narrative and the questions and ideas it raised on game development, while others felt the game forced some of Wreden's thoughts too hard and in a pretentious manner.

Gameplay
The gameplay in The Beginner's Guide is presented in a first-person perspective allowing the player to move about and explore the environment and interact with some elements of it as they progress along the work's interactive storytelling. The player hears details of the various scenes they explore via the game's narrator, Wreden himself, to describe what they see and make conclusions on the nature of the games' developer. Some areas include puzzle solving and conversation trees, but there is no way for the player-character to die, or the player to make a mistake or lose the game. The narration helps the player get past certain parts of the game-spaces that were otherwise difficult or insuperable as designed, such as by providing a bridge to cross an invisible maze after the player discovers the difficulty. Once the player has completed a chapter, they can then return to any of them within the game, as well as disable the narration (and the help it provides) to explore the spaces on their own. The game has metafictional elements.

Plot

The concept of the game is based on trying to understand the nature of a person based on exploring files and documents on their computer without any other notes or documentation or knowing this person in the first place. In the game, the player, aided by Wreden's narration, looks to understand that of a game developer named Coda whom Wreden had met at a game jam in 2009. Coda is considered enigmatic, having created numerous strange game ideas which he has subsequently deleted or stored away and forgotten. The player explores these games, most being exploration games developed from 2008 to 2011 that were only half-created, and is encouraged by Wreden's narration to try to imagine what Coda's personality would be like based on the abstract and unconventional game spaces and ideas. The Beginner's Guide is presented in generally chronological order of Coda's prototypes, showing the progression of Coda's work as the developer learned more.

Wreden's narration explains that he was inspired by many of Coda's game concepts, providing his own analysis on many of the themes he perceived to appear in Coda's games. However, Wreden had seen that many of the games are based on themes of prisons, isolation, and difficulty in communicating with others, and that eventually Coda's games took a darker tone and took much longer to produce, focusing even more strongly on dialogue that implied that game development was no longer a positive activity for Coda. Wreden felt concerned that Coda was feeling depressed and weighed down by game development, and took it upon himself to show some of Coda's game concepts to others to get feedback to help encourage Coda to develop more. However, this in turn led to Coda to draw into seclusion. At some point in 2011, Wreden believed Coda had stopped making games, until he was sent an email with a private link to a final game by Coda.

This game, its design in stark contrast to the others Coda had made, included puzzles that were intentionally designed to be almost impossible to solve, such as an invisible maze, a six-digit combination that the player must randomly guess, and an impossible-to-open door that cannot be opened from within the room the door leads out of. Wreden found that when he was able to use various programming tools to bypass these, he ended up in a gallery with a message from Coda directed at him personally, thanking him for his interest in Coda's games but asking him not to talk to him any more, nor to showcase his games to others. The messages implied Coda felt that Wreden mistook the tone of his games as a sign of an emotional struggle and was missing the point of why he had engaged in game design, as well as accusing Wreden with modifying Coda's games to add more symbolism, and that Wreden's actions had betrayed Coda. As a result, Wreden felt terrible about what he had done, and thus reveals that the purpose of The Beginner's Guide is to try to reconnect to Coda by sharing his games with the public at large and to hope to apologize for his actions.

The game concludes with an ambiguous epilogue level that may or may not have been designed by Coda, with Wreden sparsely narrating about his dependence on social validation, something he saw as the cause for showing Coda's games to other people. Shortly before the end, the emotional turmoil dredged up by recording the narration grows to be too much for Wreden, and he excuses himself as the player makes their way to the end of the final level. At the denouement, the player must jump into a beam from an earlier game, causing them to float up, to see an infinite maze.

Interpretations
Within the game, Wreden states that The Beginner's Guide is open to interpretation and invites players to share their own theories with him, providing his email address near the start of the game.

One common interpretation is that the game is a metaphor for Wreden's own success and attempts to move past his struggles, with Coda being a fictional developer created for the game. Destructoid writer Darren Nakamura points out that for Wreden to publish a game at cost that is claimed to be the work of someone else, released without their permission, would be illegal, and thus providing evidence that Coda must be part of the game's fiction. Emanuel Maiberg of Motherboard theorizes that Coda is in fact Wreden himself, with Coda representing Wreden's own psyche up to and including the release of The Stanley Parable. Among other hints in the game, Maiberg explains that the name "Coda" can be taken as its definition, meaning "a concluding part of a literary or dramatic work", and the theme of closing one door and moving on repeats frequently in the game. Maiberg also points to one of the game concepts where the player in Coda's game is inundated with abstract figures from the press, and considers how much attention Wreden had received following The Stanley Parables re-release. Christopher Byrd, writing for the Washington Post, points to blog posts made by Wreden after he had received a great deal of attention following the re-release of The Stanley Parable, and that the game's version of Wreden is really a fictionalized version of himself acting as an unreliable narrator, building upon his own personal experiences from the sudden media spotlight in the relationship between the fictional Wreden and Coda. Interactive fiction writer Emily Short believes that neither Wreden-as-narrator nor Coda are to be taken as Wreden's own self, but instead two representative characters of the game player and game developer, respectively, that Wreden attempts to show sympathy for in modern game development.

Another interpretative theme taken by some is that the game is presented as commentary on the role between the video game developer and their audience. PC Worlds Hayden Dingman believed the game was designed to demonstrate the fallacy of the Death of the Author essay applied to video game development, in which commentators attempt to attribute aspects of a game to how the game developer approached it, as opposed to considering how the game affected themselves.  Gamasutra's editor-in-chief Kris Graft notes that, as the game attempts to deconstruct the way players will interpret narrative video games, any attempt to interpret the deeper meaning behind The Beginner's Guide is paradoxically "committing all of the sins" that the game presents as problems with player interpretations of games. Laura Mandanas, writing for Autostraddle, described the game as "a man (poorly) coming to terms with his hugely overinflated sense of entitlement", interpreting the game's themes as not only applicable to game development, but also to inter-personal relationships.

Some have taken the game to be a work of non-fiction, in that the games presented are works of a real developer other than Wreden, and that the game itself could be seen as an unethical use of someone else's work and potentially copyright-violating. In considering this aspect, Destructoids Laura Kate Dale commented with later clarification that the game was short enough to fall within the Steam refund window for those who believed the game was non-fiction and thus contained stolen works to return the game. Dale's statement, prior to clarification, led to some controversy in that Dale was suggesting misuse of the Steam refund system, though her clarification made it clear she was addressing those believing it to be non-fiction. The controversy led some to point out that the interpretation of the game was very personal, differing between each player; Wreden himself in light of the controversy refused to affirm or deny any interpretation of the game, until confirming the game's ultimately fictional nature in an in-depth interview with the podcast Tone Control.

Development
The Beginner's Guide was developed on the Source engine, which itself serves as part of Wreden's commentary within the game on the nature of level design limited by the Source engine. Wreden has stated that he does not plan to give media interviews about the game and is letting the game speak for itself.

The Beginner's Guide was announced by Wreden two days before its official release on October 1, 2015. The game was developed by Wreden himself; his co-creator for The Stanley Parable, William Pugh, had been engaged in creating a new studio, Crows Crows Crows, and working on projects with Justin Roiland, the co-creator of Rick and Morty, with one title being a similar exploration game, Dr. Langeskov, The Tiger, and The Terribly Cursed Emerald: A Whirlwind Heist.

Reception

The Beginner's Guide received polarized reviews on its release. Several reviewers were very positive about the allusions it made to game development. Jeffrey Matulef of Eurogamer considered The Beginner's Guide to be one of the site's "Essential" titles, calling the game a novel approach to providing story without relying on non-player characters or collectible diaries, and also an insight into Wreden's own psyche.
Stephanie Bendixsen and Steven O'Donnell of Good Game both gave the game five stars, O'Donnell calling it "gut-wrenchingly emotional" and Bendixsen commenting that the game "honestly made me experience the whole creative process in a completely different way." 

Edmond Tran of GameSpot, giving the game an 8 of 10 rating, identifies that the game asks philosophical questions on the nature of the role between game developers and players, and how to understand some elements of video game design. Pastes Cameron Kunzelman compared Wreden's self-insertion as the narrator to that of Alfred Hitchcock, and suggested that Wreden's Janus-like duality between being the game's narrator as well as the game's developer poses many questions for the player to think about regarding the nature of video game development. Jeff Marchiafava for Game Informer, rating the game 8 out of 10, stated that Wreden's approach to the game created a thought-provoking experience, "tackling serious human issues and emotions in a wholly unique way." 

Todd Martens, writing for the Los Angeles Times, said that The Beginner's Guide is "an odd, thoughtful and beautifully surreal game" with much of its imagery being iconic and memorable well after the player has finished the game. Christopher Byrd, writing for the Washington Post, said the game blurred the line with interactive art and called it "one of the most emotionally alive games on the market." The Boston Globes Jesse Singal stated that with The Beginner's Guide, "Wreden is pushing the boundaries of storytelling in video games", including using narrative tricks that went beyond those that were already used in The Stanley Parable.

Other reviewers criticized the game, finding the narration and intended message was too forced. Brittany Vincent of Shacknews was more critical of the game, rating it 3 out of 10, and stating that the narration was pretentious while the game concepts felt forced and overly complex. Ars Technicas Sam Machkovech called the game Wreden's "sophomore slump", and felt that while the game was intended as a personal journal for Wreden, his emotion-driven narration telegraphed the final moments of the game and failed to follow "show, don't tell" narrative techniques. US Gamers Bob Mackey rated the game 2 of 5 stars, sharing the same opinion as Machkovech that Wreden's narration pushed too much interpretation onto the player, and felt a game like The Magic Circle, also dealing with exploring an unfinished game and the reasons for why it was unfinished, succeeded better at presenting this idea. Tyler Wilde of PC Gamer gave the game a 69 out of 100 rating, feeling that some of Wreden's messages were delivered a bit heavy-handedly through the narration but still positively critiquing some of the experimental approaches that were used for narration and player experience.

Awards
Gamasutra highlighted Wreden as one of the top 10 developers in 2015 for his work in The Beginner's Guide. The game was named as one of the top new IP for 2015 by Destructoid. The New Yorker included The Beginner's Guide among its top 11 games for 2015. It was nominated for two 2016 Game Developers Choice Awards for Innovation and Best Narrative, and for two Independent Games Festival awards for Excellence in Narrative and the Nuovo Award for Innovation. The Beginner's Guide was nominated for "Most Innovative" game of 2015 by IGN.

References

External links

2015 video games
Windows games
MacOS games
Linux games
Self-reflexive video games
Single-player video games
Source (game engine) games
First-person adventure games
Art games
Exploration video games
Metafictional video games
Video games about video games
Fiction with unreliable narrators
Works about artists
Video games developed in the United States